Kirkwood is an unincorporated community in Nicholas County, in the U.S. state of West Virginia.

History
A post office called Kirkwood was established in 1902, and remained in operation until 1939. The community was named after an early settler.

References

Unincorporated communities in Nicholas County, West Virginia
Unincorporated communities in West Virginia